Lindsay Edward "Lew" Wilson (born 15 October 1948) is a former New Zealand rower who won two Olympic medals.

Wilson was born in Methven, New Zealand in 1948. At the 1972 Summer Olympics in Munich, he teamed with Dick Joyce, Wybo Veldman, John Hunter, Tony Hurt, Joe Earl, Trevor Coker and Gary Robertson and Simon Dickie (cox) to win the gold medal in the eights. He rowed with the coxed eight in the 1975 World Rowing Championships in Nottingham, Great Britain, and won a bronze medal. At the 1976 Summer Olympics in Montreal, he again crewed the eight which this time won the bronze medal. His crewmates this time were Alec McLean, Ivan Sutherland, Trevor Coker, Peter Dignan, Tony Hurt, Joe Earl and Dave Rodger and Simon Dickie (cox).

Wilson was later a public servant in Hamilton working in Maori Affairs.

References

External links
 
 

1948 births
Living people
New Zealand male rowers
Olympic gold medalists for New Zealand in rowing
Olympic bronze medalists for New Zealand
Rowers at the 1972 Summer Olympics
Rowers at the 1976 Summer Olympics
World Rowing Championships medalists for New Zealand
Medalists at the 1976 Summer Olympics
Medalists at the 1972 Summer Olympics
European Rowing Championships medalists